Allan R. Odden is Professor in the Department of Educational Leadership & Policy Analysis, and Co-Director, Consortium for Policy Research in Education in the Wisconsin Center for Education Research at the University of Wisconsin–Madison.

Odden directs school finance and teacher compensation research at the Consortium for Policy Research in Education. CPRE includes the University of Wisconsin–Madison together with the University of Pennsylvania, Harvard University, the University of Michigan, and Stanford University in research on education reform, policy, and finance, supported by the U.S. Department of Education, and the Carnegie Corporation

Odden's text School Finance: A Policy Perspective is a widely used text.

Bibliography

References

University of Wisconsin–Madison faculty
Living people
Year of birth missing (living people)